The term Sprint race may refer to:
Formula One sprint racing
Short-distance speed skating races
Short horse racing competitions
Sprint car racing
Sprint cycling events
Sprint running events in track and field

See also
Sprint Cup (disambiguation)